A Time Out of War is a 1954 American short war film directed by Denis Sanders and starring Corey Allen and Barry Atwater. In 1955, it won an Academy Award for Best Short Subject (Two-Reel) at the 27th Academy Awards, first prize at the Venice Film Festival Live Action Short Film category, and a BAFTA Special Award, among others.

Summary
The film depicts a one-hour truce agreed to by Union and Confederate soldiers who are on opposite sides of a river.

Production
Denis Sanders was in UCLA film school whilst his brother was a UCLA undergraduate.  For Denis's thesis, he searched for an American Civil War short story that was in the public domain to adapt into a film.  He chose Pickets, an 1897 story by Robert W. Chambers.

Reception and legacy
Critic Bosley Crowther called it "a keen and eloquent little picture".

The prestige of the film led Terry to be hired by Charles Laughton as the second unit director of The Night of the Hunter (1955). Both brothers were then hired to write the screenplay for The Naked and the Dead, which led to film careers for both men.

The Academy Film Archive preserved A Time Out of War in 2007 and it was added to the National Film Registry.

Cast
 Corey Allen as Connor
 Barry Atwater as Craig

References

External links

A Time Out of War at the American Film Foundation

1954 films
1954 short films
American black-and-white films
American Civil War films
1950s English-language films
Films based on works by Robert W. Chambers
Films directed by Denis Sanders
Live Action Short Film Academy Award winners
United States National Film Registry films
American war films
1954 war films
1950s American films
1950s independent films